Hamilton River is located in the Grand Falls area of Labrador. The post office was established here on July 31, 1952. The first Postmistress was Mrs Una Saunders. The mail arrived four times a week from Goose Bay. In 1954 the Postmaster was Robert H. Davis and in 1956, Gordon Broomfield and 1957, Mrs. Emma Nila Shaw. On May 23, 1957 it became part of Happy Valley.

See also
List of communities in Newfoundland and Labrador
References on main article page.

Populated places in Labrador